Love Island Australia is an Australian dating reality show based on the international Love Island franchise. Following the premise of other versions of the Love Island format, the show features a group of single contestants, known as "islanders" who live together in a luxury villa that is isolated from the outside world, in an attempt to find love. Throughout the series, the contestants "couple up" to avoid being dumped from the villa. Additionally, Australia will vote for their favourite islanders to stay in the villa. As old islanders are dumped, new islanders will enter the villa. At the end, Australia will vote one final time to determine the winning couple. The series is presented by Sophie Monk and narrated by Eoghan McDermott from seasons 1 to 2 and Stephen Mullan from season 3 onwards.

The first season aired on Nine's secondary channel 9Go! and on Nine's free ad-supported video on demand streaming service 9Now in mid 2018. With subsequent seasons airing on Nine Network's main channel, with the second season airing in late 2019. with production being relocated to a villa in Fiji.

Following a hiatus in 2020, Nine announced the series will return for a third season in 2021, with production originally being relocated to a villa on the Gold Coast. In July 2021, Nine confirmed the series will be filmed in Port Douglas. However, in August 2021 production was relocated due to border closures to Northern NSW. It was confirmed during Nine’s 2022 upfronts that the series will film in Byron Bay. The fourth season premiered on 31 October 2022.

Format
Love Island involves a group of contestants, referred to as Islanders, living in isolation from the outside world in a villa, and constantly under video surveillance. They are allowed to use their phones for the sole reason of receiving texts from producers, alerting them of upcoming dates and activities. To survive in the villa the Islanders must be coupled up with another Islander, whether it be for love, friendship, survival or money, as the overall winning couple receives $50,000. On the first day, the Islanders couple up for the first time based on first impressions, but over the duration of the series, they are forced to "re-couple" where they can choose to remain in their current couple or swap and change. It is common for Islanders to strategically choose their partner not based on love but as a pact for the two to stay on the island as long as possible, waiting for their ideal match.

Any Islander who remains single after the coupling is eliminated and dumped from the island. Islanders can also be eliminated via public vote, as during the series the Australian public will be instructed to vote through the Love Island app available on smartphones for their favourite islanders, or who they think is the most compatible. Couples who receive the fewest votes risk being eliminated. Additionally, at points in the series, the dumpings will be determined by the Islanders, as they are forced to vote one of their own off the island. During the final week, the public vote for which couple they want to win the series and therefore take home $50,000.

Villas

Mallorca, Spain
Like the UK version, during season one, the Islanders lived in a villa located in Mallorca, Spain. It includes open-plan living, with one large bedroom for the Islanders to sleep, however there are also day beds outside if un-coupled partners chose to sleep together, and also a Hideaway bedroom for couples to spend the night away from the others as a reward. The villa also comes with a pool, hot tub and all important fire pit. Every moment was captured by one of the 65 cameras and 55 microphones.

Fiji
Season Two was filmed in Fiji, which is closer to Australia. It is reported that the move was made so new cast members could be added at short notice, meaning plenty of twists and turns for fans.

Byron Bay 
Season Three was initially to be filmed in Port Douglas, in Far North Queensland. However, due to border restrictions during the COVID-19 pandemic in Australia, filming was relocated to Northern New South Wales in late-August 2021.

Series overview

Reception 
Love Island Australia averaged around 200,000 viewers for its linear broadcasts in overnight OzTAM ratings, increasing to an average of 511,000 when adding viewers from Nine's streaming service, 9Now. The series performed strongest in the youngest key demographic band (16 to 39 year olds), but ranked low amongst total viewers.

International syndication
The series also airs in the United Kingdom on ITV2 along with UK and US versions of the show and in the Republic of Ireland on Virgin Media Three, has also been made available on streaming service on Hulu.

References

2010s Australian reality television series
2018 Australian television series debuts
2020s Australian reality television series
9Go! original programming
Australian dating and relationship reality television series
Australian television series based on British television series
Australia
Nine Network original programming
Television series by ITV Studios